Taunsa Barrage railway station 
() is a railway station in Pakistan.

See also
 List of railway stations in Pakistan
 Pakistan Railways

References

External links

Railway stations in Dera Ghazi Khan District